Douglas John Harrop (born 16 April 1947) is a former English cricketer. Harrop was a left-handed batsman who fielded as a wicket-keeper. He was born at Cosby, Leicestershire.

Harrop made a single first-class appearance for Leicestershire against Oxford University at the University Parks in 1972. Leicestershire won the toss and elected to bat first, making 289/9 declared, during which Harrop was dismissed for a duck by Michael Wagstaffe. Oxford University then responded in their first-innings by making 125 all out, during which Harrop took two catches from behind the stumps, catching behind David Williams and Wagstaffe. In their second-innings, Leicestershire made 149/5 declared, with Harrop ending the innings not out on 11. Set 314 for victory, Oxford University were dismissed for 269 in their second-innings chase, giving Leicestershire victory by 44 runs. During that innings, Harrop caught behind Wagstaffe for the second time in the match. This was his only major appearance for Leicestershire.

References

External links
Douglas Harrop at ESPNcricinfo
Douglas Harrop at CricketArchive

1947 births
Living people
People from Cosby, Leicestershire
Cricketers from Leicestershire
English cricketers
Leicestershire cricketers
Wicket-keepers